Beaty is a surname. Notable people with the name include:

Albert Lee Beaty (1869–1936), American politician
Andrea Beaty, American children's author
Aubrey Beaty (1916–2009), British Army soldier
Daniel Beaty (born 1975), American actor, singer, writer, composer, and poet
David Beaty, several people
Frank Beaty (1919–1985), American professional basketball player
James Beaty, several people
Forrest Beaty (born 1944), American track and field athlete
Gary Beaty (born 1943), American disc jockey and television announcer
Howard Beaty, American politician
James Beaty, several people
Madisen Beaty (born 1995), American teen actress
Malcolm Beaty (born 1939), English cricketer
Martin Beaty (1784–1856), United States Representative from Kentucky
Matt Beaty (born 1993), American baseball player
Powhatan Beaty (1837–1916), African American soldier and actor
Richard William Beaty (c.1799–1883), Irish music teacher, composer and organist
Robert T Beaty, Scottish engineer
Zelmo Beaty (1939–2013), American professional basketball player

See also
Beatie, given name and surname
Beatty (surname)
Batey (surname)